The Elgins were a 1960s Motown group.

The Elgins may also refer to:

 The Elgins, a 1960s Flip Records group
 Another Motown group later known as The Temptations
 Short title for the Canadian 31st Combat Engineer Regiment